Robert Dickinson (born 23 July 1965) is a British musician, multi-instrumentalist, and singer-songwriter previously of the band Catherine Wheel. Dickinson was raised in Norfolk, England, and is the paternal cousin of Iron Maiden frontman Bruce Dickinson. He is now a solo artist and the founder and creative director of Singer Vehicle Design since 2009, which performs restoration and modification of client vehicles.

Career
While a member of Catherine Wheel from 1990 to 2000, Dickinson co-wrote and sang lead vocals on several hit singles. However, after the 2000 release of Catherine Wheel's last album, Wishville, the group disbanded.

Dickinson contributed vocals to two tracks on The Jimmy Chamberlin Complex album, Life Begins Again, which was released in January 2005.  Dickinson returned to the music scene in September 2005 with the release of his debut solo album, Fresh Wine for the Horses. The album includes tracks written by Dickinson while a member of Catherine Wheel, as well as newer material.  The release was supported by a tour of small venues across the United States and Canada, where Dickinson performed intimate acoustic sets of both Catherine Wheel and solo material.

In February 2006, he discussed his new solo record and his career with Catherine Wheel in an interview with Auralgasms.com prior to his solo set in Ferndale, Michigan.

At the invitation of Marty Willson-Piper of The Church, Dickinson toured the US with The Church during July and August 2006, opening each show and joining the band on stage for two encores.

On 10 June 2008, Fresh Wine for the Horses was re-released by Universal/Fontana with the new song "The End of the World" and a bonus disc, "Nude", which features Dickinson's re-workings of six Catherine Wheel songs including "Black Metallic" and "Crank".

His song "The Storm" was featured on an episode of Discovery's series Deadliest Catch.

Discography

Catherine Wheel

Solo
 Fresh Wine for the Horses (2005)

Guest appearances
 Provided vocals on the singles Life Begins Again and Love Is Real on the 2005 album Life Begins Again by The Jimmy Chamberlin Complex
 Provided vocals on the single Where We Are on the 2007 album Act 2: The Blood and the Life Eternal by Neverending White Lights
 Provided vocals on the singles Always and The Unbreakable on the 2010 album These Hopeful Machines by BT
 Provided vocals on the 2010 cover single Mercy Street by Spotlight Floodlight, originally recorded by Peter Gabriel for the 1986 album So

Videography
 "Oceans" (2005), directed by Mike Hodgkinson

Singer Vehicle Design

In 2009, Dickinson founded Singer Vehicle Design, which restores and modifies the 911/964 version of these automobiles (Soon 930 Turbo models). The company, located in Los Angeles, California, was named both in honor of renowned Porsche engineer, Norbert Singer, and Dickinson's other career as a vocalist.

References

External links
 MySpace.com page
 Dickinson's commercial venture Singer Vehicle Design

1965 births
Living people
English rock guitarists
English rock singers
English male singer-songwriters
Musicians from Norwich
English male guitarists